Come Back (German: Komm zurück) is a 1953 West German drama film directed by Alfred Braun and starring Winnie Markus, Rudolf Prack and Hans Stüwe. It was shot at the Bendestorf and Wandsbek Studios in Hamburg. Location shooting took place around Stade and on the Rhine. The film's sets were designed by the art directors Hans Ledersteger, Ernst Richter and Hans Richter.

Cast
 Winnie Markus as Sabine Viborg
 Rudolf Prack as Martin Larsen
 Hans Stüwe as Konrad Frisius
 Rasma Ducat as Titine Clomord-Singer
 Joachim Rake as Gert Hassler
 Margreth Meier-Wolters as Frau Muthesius
 Alfred Braun as Vokrodt
 Helmut Gmelin as Danehl
 Eva Fiebig as Fräulein Kranboer
 Carl Voscherau as Bloom
 Etta Braun as Marguerite
 Teddy Turai as La Chaussee
 Kurt Fuß as Franz Zollinspektor
 Axel Monjé

References

Bibliography 
 Bock, Hans-Michael & Bergfelder, Tim. The Concise CineGraph. Encyclopedia of German Cinema. Berghahn Books, 2009.

External links 
 

1953 films
West German films
German drama films
1953 drama films
1950s German-language films
Films directed by Alfred Braun
Gloria Film films
Films scored by Robert Stolz
German black-and-white films
1950s German films
Films shot at Wandsbek Studios